Temescal Canyon (Temescal, Spanish for "sweat lodge") is a valley lying in Pacific Palisades with-in the Los Angeles County portion of the Santa Monica Mountains in California.

Head of Canyon 
Mouth of Canyon

References

Canyons and gorges of California
Santa Monica Mountains
Landforms of Los Angeles County, California
Pacific Palisades, Los Angeles